I pappagalli (The Parrots) is a 1955 Italian comedy film directed by Bruno Paolinelli.

Cast 
Aldo Fabrizi: Antonio
Alberto Sordi: Alberto Tanzi
Maria Fiore: Caterina
Maria Pia Casilio: Fulvia
Peppino De Filippo: Beppi
Titina De Filippo: wife of Antonio
Elsa Merlini: Antonietta
Cosetta Greco: Giulietta
Madeleine Fischer: Liliana, Alberto's wife 
Gianrico Tedeschi: The painter 
Carlo Delle Piane: The corporal 
Laura Gore
Marco Tulli
Raffaele Pisu
Maria Grazia Francia

References

External links

1955 films
Italian comedy films
1955 comedy films
Films directed by Bruno Paolinelli
Italian black-and-white films
1950s Italian films